George Busk FRS FRAI (12 August 1807 – 10 August 1886) was a British naval surgeon, zoologist and palaeontologist.

Early life, family and education
Busk was born in St. Petersburg, Russia. He was the son of the merchant Robert Busk and his wife Jane. Robert Busk was the son of Sir Wadsworth Busk, who was an Attorney General of the Isle of Man. Jane Busk's father, John Westly, was Customs House clerk in St. Petersburg.

He studied at Dr. Hartley's School in Yorkshire. He studied surgery in London, at both St Thomas' Hospital and for one session at St Bartholomew's Hospital.

Career
Busk was appointed assistant-surgeon to the Greenwich Hospital in 1832. In Busk's time it was used by the Seamen's Hospital Society as a hospital ship for ex-members of the Merchant Navy or fishing fleet and their dependants. During this period Busk made important observations on cholera and on scurvy.

He founded the Greenwich Natural History Society in 1852, serving as its president until 1858.

In 1855, he retired from service and from medicine and settled in London, where he devoted himself mainly to the study of zoology and palaeontology. As early as 1842, he assisted in editing the Microscopical Journal; and later he edited the Quarterly Journal of Microscopical Science (1853–68) and the Natural History Review (1861–65). He was a member of the famous X-Club, founded by T. H. Huxley, which was active in revitalising science in the period 1865–1885. Busk and his wife Ellen were close friends of Huxley. Busk successfully nominated Charles Darwin for the Copley Medal, the highest award of the Royal Society,  in 1864.

From 1856 to 1859, he was Hunterian Professor of Comparative Anatomy and Physiology in the Royal College of Surgeons, and he became President of the college in 1871. He was elected Fellow of the Royal Society in 1850. Busk was an active member of the Linnean Society, the Geological Society and president of the Ethnological Society and then the Anthropological Institute (1873–74). He received the Royal Society's Royal Medal and the Geological Society's Wollaston and Lyell medals.

Busk was the leading authority on the Polyzoa; and later the vertebrate remains from caverns and river deposits occupied his attention. In 1862, Busk was again in Gibraltar. He was responsible of bringing to England the Gibraltar skull (the second Neanderthal fossil ever found and the first known adult one) which was excavated at Gibraltar in 1848. The identification of the skull as belonging to a Neanderthal was not made until the 20th century.

Personal life and demise
On 12 August 1843 George Busk married Ellen Busk, his first cousin. They had two daughters.

He died in London on 10 August 1886 and is buried at Kensal Green Cemetery, London, in the northern section of the central circle.

Notes

References

Attribution

External links

 
 

1807 births
1886 deaths
19th-century English medical doctors
Alumni of the Medical College of St Bartholomew's Hospital
British palaeontologists
English zoologists
Burials at Kensal Green Cemetery
English biologists
English surgeons
Fellows of the Royal Society
Fellows of the Royal College of Surgeons
Lyell Medal winners
Fellows of the Linnean Society of London
Fellows of the Ethnological Society of London
Royal Medal winners
Wollaston Medal winners
19th-century Royal Navy personnel
Presidents of the Royal Anthropological Institute of Great Britain and Ireland
Royal Navy Medical Service officers
Fellows of the Royal Anthropological Institute of Great Britain and Ireland